Uroš Pavlovčič or Pavlovič may refer to:

 Uroš Pavlovčič (skier) (born 1972), Slovenian alpine skier
 Uroš Pavlovič (volleyball) (born 1992), Slovenian volleyball player